Ambasa (アンバサ) is a milk-based soft drink sold by The Coca-Cola Company in Japan. It was introduced in 1982. The company also brought the brand into South Korea in 1984. Variants of this drink, like non-carbonated or fruits (melon and strawberry) flavoured versions, are sold in Japan.

Ingredients
The Korean version of Ambasa includes water, liquid fructose, sugar, skim milk powder, carbon dioxide, and citric acid as ingredients.

References

Coca-Cola brands
Japanese drinks
Korean drinks